The 1901 United States Senate election in Massachusetts was held in January 1901. Incumbent Republican Senator George Frisbie Hoar was re-elected to a fifth term in office.

At the time, Massachusetts elected United States senators by a resolution of the Massachusetts General Court.

Background

State legislature

At the time, the Massachusetts legislature was controlled by the Republican Party, as it had been since that party's founding, typically in dominant fashion. The Senate was composed of 31 Republicans and 9 Democrats, and the House had 179 Republicans, 58 Democrats, 2 Social Democrats, and one independent.

Candidates

Declared
George Frisbie Hoar, incumbent U.S. Senator

Hoar faced no evident opposition from Republicans.

Election

Caucuses
In caucuses held on January 14, Republicans re-nominated Hoar unanimously.

Democrats, as a matter of party honors, nominated former Secretary of State Richard Olney after several ballots. Many Democrats praised Hoar, and there was a movement to nominate him as their candidate as well. Some argued that nominating Olney for a hopeless campaign would actual diminish his reputation and weaken his prospects for Governor or President. Martin Lomasney, though he pledged to vote for the caucus nominee, compared Hoar to the late William Ewart Gladstone.

Election
Both houses met separately on January 15 and ratified Hoar's re-election. Hoar received some Democratic votes.

On January 16, the houses met in joint convention and announced Hoar's re-election.

Aftermath
Hoar died in October 1904 after over 27 years in the Senate. Winthrop Murray Crane was appointed to fill the vacant seat, and Crane won an election for the remainder of the term in 1905.

References

1901
Massachusetts
United States Senate